Anthochaera is a genus of birds in the honeyeater family. The species are endemic to Australia and include the little wattlebird, the red wattlebird, the western wattlebird, and the yellow wattlebird. A molecular phylogenetic study has shown that the regent honeyeater also belongs in this genus.

Description 
Of the five species in the genus only the yellow wattlebird (Anthochaera paradoxa)  and the red wattlebird  (A. carunculata) have the wattles of their common name. These are bare fleshy appendages, usually wrinkled and often brightly coloured, hanging from the cheeks, neck or throat, and presumably serving for display.

A common name for species of the genus is wattlebird, a term also used for unrelated avian species.

Taxonomy
The genus Anthochaera was introduced in 1827 by the naturalists Nicholas Aylward Vigors and Thomas Horsfield. The name is derived from the Greek anthos meaning flower or bloom and khairō meaning to enjoy. The type species was designated as the little wattlebird by the German ornithologist Hans Friedrich Gadow in 1884. 

The regent honeyeater (Anthochaera phrygia) was formerly placed in its own genus, Xanthomyza, but placed with the Anthochaera genus in a 2004 molecular phylogenetic study. The genus Anthochaera is sister group to the species Acanthagenys rufogularis, the spiny-cheeked honeyeater, separated as a monotypic genus.

Species and distribution 
The genus Anthochaera contains the following species:

See also
 List of Australian birds

References

External links
Wattlebird videos on the Internet Bird Collection

 
^
Bird genera
Taxa named by Thomas Horsfield
Taxa named by Nicholas Aylward Vigors